Spensha Baker is an American singer from San Antonio, Texas. She is best known for coming in fourth place on the fourteenth season of The Voice.

Career
Spensha Baker started her singing career at a very young age as a 2004 contestant on Star Search. She performed at the White House for President George W. Bush.

She released her first album, Outloud!, explaining that she named it Outloud!, because "that is the way I live my life: Openly. I want to succeed and fail out loud. I want to laugh out loud, breathe out loud, love out loud, and live out loud. Not only is this my personal anthem, but I’m positive it can be an anthem for everyone. It's also the title track on my album.”

The Voice
Baker was a 2018 contestant on Season 14 of the American The Voice. She auditioned for the show in an episode broadcast on March 6, 2018 singing "Blackbird" by the Beatles. She earned chair turns from Kelly Clarkson and Blake Shelton and ultimately chose to be on Team Blake. In the Battles round, she was paired with Dallas Caroline with both singing "I Could Use a Love Song" by Maren Morris. Coach Shelton picked Baker to move to the Knockouts round. Spensha won the Knockout vs. Austin Giorgio and moved on to the Live Playoffs. Then during the Live Playoffs, she was chosen by her coach, Blake Shelton to move on to the Top 12. During the Top 12 week, Baker sang "Down on My Knees" by Trisha Yearwood, advancing through to the Top 11. During Top 11 week, Baker sang "Better Man" by Little Big Town, advancing through to the Top 10. During Top 10 week, Baker sang "Red" by Taylor Swift, advancing through to the semi-finals. In the semi-finals, Baker sang "My Church" by Maren Morris and a duet of "What's Going On" by Marvin Gaye and "Rise Up" by Andra Day with Kyla Jade. Her version of "My Church" reached #10 on iTunes, giving Baker an iTunes bonus multiplier, multiplying all of her iTunes votes by five. In the finals she was placed fourth behind Kyla Jade, Britton Buchanan, and Brynn Cartelli.

The Voice performances
 – Studio version of performance reached the top 10 on iTunes

Discography

Albums
 2008: OutLoud!

Singles

References

1993 births
Living people
21st-century African-American women singers
African-American women singer-songwriters
Singer-songwriters from Texas
American gospel singers
People from Killeen, Texas
The Voice (franchise) contestants
21st-century American women singers